Sukhorukov (masculine) or Sukhorukova (feminine) is a Russian surname, derived from the word "сухорукий" (literally mean "withered hand"), which may refer to:

Alexander Sukhorukov (born 1988), Russian freestyle swimmer
Anatoly Sukhorukov (1935–2014), Soviet and Russian physicist
Arkadiy Sukhorukov (born 1947), Ukrainian economist
Dmitry Sukhorukov (1922–2003), Soviet Army General
Jury Sukhorukov (born 1968), Ukrainian Olympic shooter
Viktor Sukhorukov (born 1951), Russian actor

Russian-language surnames